ST3 may refer to:

 Ducati ST3, a motorcycle model of the Ducati ST series made from 2004–07
 Sound Transit 3, a ballot measure during the November 2016 elections in Seattle, Washington
 ST3, a version of the Scream Tracker music-tracker software
 Star Trek III: The Search for Spock, a 1984 American science fiction film.

See also
 STIII (disambiguation)